Aillaud is a surname. Notable people with the name include:

Émile Aillaud (1902–1988), French architect
Gilles Aillaud (1928–2005), French painter, set decorator and scenographer
León Aillaud (1880–1936), Interim Governor of the Mexican State of Veracruz

See also
Tours Aillaud, is a group of residential buildings located in Nanterre, in the inner suburbs of Paris, France